TAD Australia (also known as Technical Aid to the Disabled) is an Australian federation of state not-for-profit organisations which provide personalized equipment, technology, and services to disabled persons, including children.

TAD was first established in New South Wales in 1975 by George Winston, who was awarded the Member of the Order of Australia for this work.

Organization
TAD work is done by volunteers, many of whom have special skills and backgrounds in fields including engineering, architecture, and trades. Most of them are retired, and looking for constructive ways to continue using their skills.  The client is asked to pay the cost of the materials used, but there is no charge for the labour.

When new designs are created, they are shared across the state organizations.

Freedom Wheels Program 
Freedom Wheels is a national program where skilled staff and volunteers work closely with children, families, and therapists to create customized bicycles.

The cost of a Freedom Wheels bicycle can be covered by Australia's National Disability Insurance Scheme (NDIS): it will be itemised by the NDIS as "Assistive Equipment for Recreation" as part of the core supports budget.

Awards
Awards presented to the organization and to its members in recognition of their service to TAD include:

 1985 - George Winston was awarded the Member of the Order of Australia for his work establishing TAD.
 2010 - NSW Volunteer of the Year Awards - Bill Phippen was the NSW Senior Volunteer of the Year.
 2011 - TAD ACT won the social inclusion category of the National Disability Awards.
 2011 - Winner Volunteering NSW's Volunteer Team of the Year Award.
 2012  - Winner NSW Disability Industry Innovation Award in Independent Living.
 2012 - NSW Disability Industry Innovation Award in Independent Living - Winner.
 2013 - Bill Phippen was awarded an Order of Australia Medal for role in establishing and running TAD, and his ongoing contributions.
 2013 - The NRMA Helping People Awards - Bill Jenkins received the Senior Volunteer Award.
 2014 - NSW Disability Industry Innovation Awards - TAD Disability Services' "Freedom Wheels" program was a Finalist.
 2015 - the Governor of NSW hosted a formal reception marking the 40th Anniversary of TAD Disability Services.
 2015 - National Disability Service's Membership Recognition Awards - recognizing 30 years' continuous service for TADACT and 20 years for TAD (NSW).
 2016 - Mid North Coast 2016 Volunteer of the Year Awards - John Brumby received both the overall Volunteer of the Year Award and the Senior Volunteer of the Year Award.
 2016 - Sydney Hornsby / North West NSW Volunteer of the Year Awards - Geoffrey Milton received both the overall Volunteer of the Year Award and the Senior Volunteer of the Year Award.
 2018 - Sydney Hornsby / North West NSW Volunteer of the Year Awards - George Tillett received both the overall NSW Volunteer of the Year for region and the Senior Volunteer of the Year awards.
 2018 - Leading Age Services Australia (LASA) Excellence in Age Service Awards Western Australia - TADWA won the Organisation Award.

References

External links 
  (Australia)
  (NSW)
 Annual Reports of TAD Disability (NSW)
 Freedom Wheels

Disability organisations based in Australia
1975 establishments in Australia
Organizations established in 1975